George Dawe  (6 February 1781 – 15 October 1829) was an English portraitist who painted 329 portraits of Russian generals active during Napoleon's invasion of Russia for the Military Gallery of the Winter Palace. He relocated to Saint Petersburg in 1819, where he won acclaim for his work from the artistic establishment and complimentary verses by Pushkin. He was the son of Philip Dawe, a successful mezzotint engraver who also produced political cartoons relating to the events of the Boston Tea Party. One of his brothers was Henry Edward Dawe, also a portraitist. He died on 15 October 1829 in Kentish Town, United Kingdom.

Life and career

Early life and studies
George Dawe was born on 6 February 1781 to Philip Dawe and Jane in Brewer Street, in the parish of St James's in Westminster. Philip was an artist and engraver in mezzotint who had worked with Hogarth and Joseph Mallord William Turner and who also produced satirical political cartoons about life in America which are still highly regarded today. George was the first child born to the couple and there would be other successful artists in the family. Dawe was baptised on 25 February 1781 at St James' Church in Piccadilly. He originally trained with his father as an engraver and became very accomplished from an early age. He later became interested in painting and went on to study at the Royal Academy of Arts where he won the Royal Academy Schools Gold Medal in 1803. He was elected an associate member of the Royal Academy in 1809 and became an Academician in 1814. He collected old masters and studied modern and classical languages, philosophy and literature. He also studied anatomy as part of his pursuit of a better understanding of the human form and undertook human dissections in his own home as well as attending operations to improve his knowledge of the human body.

Portrait painting
His painting of classical subjects won much praise and were the making of his early reputation but he was more interested in financial success and sought portraiture commissions which were lucrative and which brought him into contact with high society. However, the direct way in which he promoted his own work was not approved of by artistic society and brought considerable criticism from his contemporaries, one of whom was John Constable, who painted a background for a Dawe portrait on at least one occasion. He enjoyed the patronage of the Duke and Duchess of Kent and also that of Princess Charlotte and Prince Leopold. In 1819 he travelled with the Duke of Kent through Europe. On this tour his painting of portraits of military staff and diplomats brought him to the attention of Alexander I who commissioned him to paint the portraits of senior Russian military staff who had successfully fought Napoleon. He went to live in St Petersburg and, from 1822 to 1828, painted over 300 portraits for the military collection at the Winter Palace with his assistants, Alexander Polyakov and Wilhelm August Golicke. He became a celebrity throughout Europe and mixed with the Russian intellectual elite. Among others he met and knew were Pushkin who wrote a poem about him entitled "To Dawe Esq." In 1826 Nicholas I invited him to his coronation ceremony and in 1828 he was officially appointed First Portrait Painter of the Imperial Court.

Career in Russia

Dawe returned to England in 1828 and stayed for several months. During this time he exhibited many of his recent works and George IV was among those to whom they were privately shown.

He returned to St Petersburg in 1829 but soon became increasingly unwell with breathing difficulties following a serious cold. He had had pulmonary weakness throughout life following childhood illness. He returned to London in August 1829 and died on 15 October at the home of his brother-in-law, Thomas Wright, a celebrated engraver. He was buried in the crypt of St Paul's Cathedral and his funeral was attended by many artists and officials from the Russian embassy.

The significant body of work he created in Russia is currently housed in the military gallery in the Hermitage Museum in St Petersburg. Many of his paintings are also included in the British Royal Collection. Despite the international celebrity he enjoyed in his own lifetime his popularity did not endure in England, although in Russia he is still well-known and held in high regard.

Gallery of George Dawe's paintings (Russian noblemen and military officers)“Art UK: George Dowe”

References

External links

 
George Dawe on the website of the National Portrait Gallery
George Dawe on the Hermitage Museum website
George Dawe on the Museum of New Zealand Te Papa Tongarewa website
 Profile on Royal Academy of Arts Collections

English romantic painters
English portrait painters
Royal Academicians
People from Westminster
1781 births
1829 deaths
Painters from London
19th-century painters from the Russian Empire